Beijing Music Radio, is a radio station broadcasting at 97.4 FM in Beijing, China.

Music played
Beijing Yinyue Guangbo plays various types of music including:
 Classical Music
 Mandopop and Cantopop
 English various formats including English Top 40, Hot AC, and country music.

They also have news on every hour that is from Beijing Xinwen Guangbo radio station.

Special programs

Mid Autumn and Spring Festival programming
On occasion, Beijing Yinyue Guangbo will broadcast live concerts around the Mid Autumn Festival and Spring Festival.  The live concerts would pre-empt programs that are broadcast during the week at any other time.

Interviews with famous artists
On the weekends especially during the evenings, this station frequently broadcasts pre-recorded or live interviews with artists.

"Top 40" Countdown
The "top 40" countdown, the Chinese title uses the English phrase, is a countdown of current Mandarin pop songs.  This program occurs Saturday and Sunday nights (Beijing Time) and plays the most popular 40 songs in China for that week.  This program does not include any English or Cantonese top 40 songs even though the station does occasionally play them during other times of the day.

Every week, Beijing Music Radio broadcasts "The Week's New" chart, based on people's voting.

References

External links
 Beijing Yinyue Guangbo (Beijing Music Radio) Official Website

Mandarin-language radio stations
Radio stations in China
Mass media in Beijing